The 1921 UCI Road World Championships (the annual world championships for bicycle road racing organized by the Union Cycliste Internationale) took place in Copenhagen, Denmark on 4 August 1921. It was the first official World Championships organized by the UCI. The championships were only for amateur men. Four men per nation could participate.

Events summary 

Sweden won the nations classification (total time of the first four riders per nation) ahead of France and Italy.

Medal table

Results
The course was 190 km with the finish in Glostrup.

See also
 1921 UCI Track Cycling World Championships

References

UCI Road World Championships by year
W
R
International sports competitions in Copenhagen
International cycle races hosted by Denmark
August 1921 sports events